Web content is the text, visual or audio content that is made available online and user encountered as part of the online usage and experience on websites. It may include text, images, sounds and audio, online videos, among other items placed within web pages.

In the book Information Architecture for the World Wide Web, Lou Rosenfeld and Peter Morville wrote, "We define content broadly as 'the stuff in your website.' Web content may include webpage document pages, information, software data and applications, e-services, images, audio and video files, personal Web pages, archived e-mail messages stored on email servers, and more. And we include future web content as well as present web content roadmap."

Content management

Because websites are often complex, a term "content management" appeared in the late 1990s identifying a method or in some cases a tool to organize all the diverse elements to be contained on a website. Content management often means that within a business there is a range of people who have distinct roles to do with content management, such as content author, editor, publisher, and administrator. But it also means there may be a content management system whereby each of the different roles is organized to provide their assistance in operating the system and organizing the information for a website.  A business may also employ various content protection measures, which are typically technologies used to attempt to frustrate copying without permission.

See also

Hypermedia
Content (media)
Content farm
Content management
Digital marketing
Dynamic web page
Mobile content
Separation of content and presentation
Site map
Tim Berners-Lee
Web content lifecycle
Web content management
Web design
Web development
Web document
Web service
Web resource
Web syndication
Web template
Webmaster
Website governance
World Wide Web Consortium (Web standards)

References

 
Content management systems
Website management